Utraula is a city and a municipal board in Balrampur district in the Indian state of Uttar Pradesh.  It is approximately 90 kilometres from the border with Nepal and 175 km in north east of Lucknow. Utraula is situated near the West Rapti River.

Geography 

Utraula is a Block in Balrampur district. It is one of 9 blocks in the district. The block has 114 villages hosting 22,204 houses. Utraula Town is divided in 29 wards. Utraula sits around 28.98 km from its district headquarter Balrampur. Surrounding districts are: Gonda district (40.8 km), Shravasti district (66.3 km), Siddharthnagar district (66.78 km), Sant Kabir Nagar district (88.88 km).

Demographics 
As of 2011 Indian Census, Utraula had a population of 32,145. Males constitute 76.2% and females 66.61%. The average literacy rate is 67.68%, lower than the national average of 71.48%: male literacy is 61%, and female literacy is 46%. 14.52% are under 0 — 6 years. The Muslim Khanzada form a large part of the rural population.

Culture
The native languages of Utraula are Hindi and Urdu. Most people speak Hindi or Urdu. Utraula people use Hindi and Urdu language for communication.

Governance 
A civil court Judge, SDM office and Sub Registrar Office are there.

Transport

Bus
There is a bus station in Utraula which is connected to Gonda Lucknow Balrampur Ayodhya Faizabad Basti.

The nearest airport is Shravasti Airport, 45  km away.

References

Cities and towns in Balrampur district, Uttar Pradesh